

First-team squad

Left club during season

Results

Serie A

Notes
Note 1: Matches scheduled for 3/4 February 2007 were postponed due to the death of a police agent at the Catania vs Palermo match. NB: following the death of a police agent on Feb 2, all matches in stadiums not meeting the security standards will be played behind closed doors; the only Serie A stadiums currently fulfilling all standards are those in Rome, Genoa, Siena, Cagliari, Turin (Olimpico) and Palermo.

League table

Coppa Italia

Parma won 3-2 on aggregate.

Parma lost 4–3 on aggregate.

UEFA Cup

First round

Group stage

Knockout stage

Parma lost 2-0 on aggregate.

Squad statistics

Top scorers

Notes

Sources
  RSSSF - Italy 2006/07

Parma Calcio 1913 seasons
Parma